Henry Spurgeon Cherry Jr. (c. 1912 – June 1968) was an American football and basketball player and coach for the Florida Gators; the first chairman of the Department of Intramural Athletics and Recreation at the University of Florida, in 1946.  He played as an end on the football team for coach Charlie Bachman from 1930 to 1932. Cherry coached the Gators basketball team in the 1940s. Cherry was coach of the Hillsborough High Terriers football team from 1939 to 1941.

References

1968 deaths
American football ends
Basketball coaches from Florida
Florida Gators football coaches
Florida Gators football players
Florida Gators men's basketball coaches
High school football coaches in Florida
Players of American football from Florida
Year of birth uncertain